Kikihia cauta, the greater bronze cicada, is a species of cicada that is endemic to New Zealand. This species was first described by J. G. Myers in 1921.

References

Cicadas of New Zealand
Insects described in 1921
Endemic fauna of New Zealand
Cicadettini
Endemic insects of New Zealand